Athletics, for the 2013 Pacific Mini Games, was held at Kafika Stadium in Mata Utu, Wallis and Futuna, from 3 to 6 September 2013. There were four parasport events included, three for men and one for women.

Medal table
Key:

Medal summary

Men

Women

See also
 Athletics at the Pacific Games

References

 
 Sept. 3, 2013 Results
 Sept. 4, 2013 Results
 Sept. 5, 2013 Results
 Sept. 6, 2013 Results

Athletics at the Pacific Mini Games
Athletics in Wallis and Futuna
Pacific Mini Games
2013 Pacific Mini Games